David Chotjewitz (born 14 May 1964 in Berlin) is a German writer and theatre director who lives in Hamburg.

Life 
In 1967, his family moved to Rome, where Chotjewitz grew up until 1973. He attended the Italian primary school and later the German school of Rome. In 1973, he moved with his parents and brother to the small north Hessian village of Kruspis. He attended school in Bad Hersfeld until 1981, but left without receiving his diploma.

In 1982, he received formal vocational training from the print publisher Weismann in Munich and in spring of 1984, from the Rowohlt publishing house in Reinbek. He was married in 1983 and his daughter, Sarah, was born the same year. His first literary book publication, the collection, Frühreif - Texte aus der Plastiktüte, appeared in the spring of 1984. He wrote his first radio play, Geduld Holfstätter oder Der Erste Kuß, in 1987. In 1988, he began to translate a novel by Norma Klein, for the Frankfurt publisher, . In the 1990s, Chotjewitz worked with independent theatre companies in Hamburg and as an assistant director at the Deutsches Schauspielhaus in Hamburg, as well as at the Burgtheater in Vienna.

From 1992 to 1994, he studied with the Javanese dance and performance teacher, Suprapto Suryodarmo in Java - see Amerta Movement. In the following years, he co-operated with the Healing Theatre in Cologne and the Julia Pascal Company in London. In 1994, his novel about Albert Einstein, Das Abenteuer des Denkens (The Adventure of Thinking), was published and received a lot of attention. It has been reprinted several times, last by the Hamburg publisher, Carlsen Verlag. His award-winning novel for young people, Daniel Halber Mensch, was also published in the United States by an imprint of Simon & Schuster as Daniel Half Human and has been quite successful there.

In 1999, Chotjewitz produced his first theatre work, Der einäugige Karpfen, based on a story by Kenzaburō Ōe. In 2000, he founded the theatre project, "Theater: Playstation", which staged musical theatre projects such as BLUT on the DANCEFLOOR (BLOOD on the DANCE FLOOR, in a techno-disco) and STIRB, POPSTAR, STIRB (POPSTAR MUST DIE), in cooperation with Kampnagel Hamburg.

In the summer of 2007, he started the project, BEHÖRDE für LIEBLINGSLIEDER (MINISTRY for FAVORITE SONGS). Projects planned for 2008 include a new biographical novel about the young Goethe and a project with youths in Colombia.

"Daniel Half Human" received in the USA, among others, a Mildred L. Batchelder Award (Honor Book).
His novel Crazy Diamond, about a teenaged rockstar who dies under unclear circumstances, was published in the United States in April 2008.

Works 
 Frühreif - Texte aus der Plastiktüte, Munich 1984
 Der erste Kuß oder Geduld, Hofstätter, radio play, Süddeutscher Rundfunk 1987
 Bücher waren ihr Schicksal, radio play, Westdeutscher Rundfunk 1988
 Mitten in der Masse, radio play, Norddeutscher Rundfunk 1989
 Das große Schweigen, radio play, Norddeutscher Rundfunk 1992
 Marie ist tot, das Radio ist aus..., radio play, Radio Bremen 1993
 Daniel - Der kindliche Held, radio play, Radio Bremen 1994
 Das Abenteuer des Denkens, Roman über Albert Einstein, novel, Frankfurt 1994
 Tödliche Safari, Roman, novel, Frankfurt 1995
 Karl Marx - Roman aus dem Leben eines jungen Philosophen, novel, Frankfurt 1996
 Daniel Halber Mensch, novel for young people, Hamburg 2000 (as  Daniel Half Human, New York 2003)
 Javanische Schatten, radio play, NDR 2001
 Mr. Pitiful - Das Leben des Otis Redding, radio feature, SDR 2002
 Crazy Diamond, novel, Hamburg 2005, New York 2008

Theater works 
 Der einäugige Karpfen, based on a story by Kenzaburo Oe, Hamburg 2000
 Die Traumwandler, Hamburg 2001
 BLUT on the DANCEFLOOR, Hamburg 2002
 STIRB, POPSTAR, STIRB, Hamburg 2003
 Boys don't Cry, Hamburg 2005
 Daniel Halber Mensch, Hamburg 2006

Translations 
 Norma Klein: Familienbande 1988
 Norma Klein: Daddy's Darling 1989
 Norma Klein: Der Weg zurück 1989
 Norma Klein: Madison oder Die Freiheit der Jugen 1990
 Norma Klein: Leda oder die Anfänge der Liebe 1991
 Edith Konnecky: Allegra Maud Goldmann 1992
 Hatty Naylor: Im Pappkarton (radio play) 1992
 Slelagh Stephenson: Fünffaches Schweigen (radio play) 2003
Doris Orgel: Daniel Half Human 2004

Reviews in the internet 
 English text about Daniel Halber Mensch on the website of New Books in German
 Review by a young reader about Crazy Diamond in German
 Review of the Einstein novel in German
Doris Orgel (from Daniel Half Human and the Good Nazi)

External links 

 Official Web site with some English pages
 Simon and Schuster
 Carlsen Publisher web site in German
 Autobiographical text about his childhood in Rome and Hessen in German
 Carlsen English website

1964 births
Living people
20th-century German novelists
21st-century German novelists
German theatre directors
German publishers (people)
German expatriates in Italy
Writers from Berlin
German male novelists
German male dramatists and playwrights
20th-century German dramatists and playwrights
21st-century German dramatists and playwrights
20th-century German male writers
21st-century German male writers